Neoroepera buxifolia is a plant species in the Picrodendraceae family. It is endemic to the Gladstone District of Queensland, Australia.

References

Picrodendraceae
Flora of Queensland
Endemic flora of Australia
Taxa named by Ferdinand von Mueller
Taxa named by Johannes Müller Argoviensis